The Riverside Sports Complex, in Riverside, California, is the home field of the University of California, Riverside baseball team. The stadium seats 2,500 and features a home team locker room built personally by Troy Percival, a UC Riverside alumnus.

A statue of the UCR Bear in concrete just inside the entrance to the facility, was erected in 2007. The stadium also has a pair of hitting cages located underneath the grandstands.

History
The stadium is primarily used for baseball and was the home of Riverside Pilots before they moved to Lancaster to become the Lancaster JetHawks in 1996. It was also the home of the Riverside Red Wave from 1988 to 1990.

The stadium was the site of the Division II College World Series from 1980 to 1984.

Gallery

See also
 UC Riverside Highlanders
 List of NCAA Division I baseball venues

References

External links
 UC Riverside Highlanders Athletics

UC Riverside Highlanders baseball
Baseball venues in California
College baseball venues in the United States
Sports venues in Riverside, California
UC Riverside Highlanders sports venues